Dipika Sanjay Chavan is an Indian Politician and was a member of the 13th Maharashtra Legislative Assembly. She represents the Baglan Assembly Constituency. She belongs to the Nationalist Congress Party

References

Maharashtra MLAs 2014–2019
Nationalist Congress Party politicians from Maharashtra
Living people
People from Nashik district
Marathi politicians
21st-century Indian women politicians
21st-century Indian politicians
Year of birth missing (living people)
Women members of the Maharashtra Legislative Assembly